Frank Cumiskey (6 September 1912 – 22 July 2004) was an American gymnast who competed in the 1932 Summer Olympics, in the 1936 Summer Olympics, and in the 1948 Summer Olympics.

Cumiskey was a resident of North Bergen, New Jersey.

He was of Polish descent.

References

1912 births
2004 deaths
American male artistic gymnasts
Gymnasts at the 1932 Summer Olympics
Gymnasts at the 1936 Summer Olympics
Gymnasts at the 1948 Summer Olympics
Olympic silver medalists for the United States in gymnastics
American people of Polish descent
Medalists at the 1932 Summer Olympics
People from North Bergen, New Jersey
Sportspeople from Hudson County, New Jersey